Charles Jeffrey may refer to:
 Charles Jeffrey (footballer)
 Charles Jeffrey (fashion designer)
 Charles Jeffrey (botanist)